Stuart Parker may refer to:

 Stuart Parker (politician) (born 1972), former leader of the Green Party in British Columbia, Canada
 Stuart Parker (footballer, born 1954), English football manager and former footballer
 Stuart Parker (footballer, born 1963), English football goalkeeper who played for Wrexham
 Stuart Parker (tennis) (born 1997), British tennis player
 Stuart Parker (Neighbours), a fictional character from the Australian soap opera Neighbours
 Stuart Parker, CEO of USAA (United Services Automobile Association)